St. Herman of Solovki (died 1479) was one of the founders of the Solovetsky Monastery. In total, he lived in Solovetsky Islands, at the time, the most remote location, for about 50 years.

In 1429 Herman, who was presumably of Karelian origin, met a monk, Sabbatius, who previously settled near a chapel on the Vyg River. They were both looking for a desolate place, to avoid the crowds. They sailed together to Solovetsky Islands, where they lived as hermits. In 1435 Savvatiy died, and Herman returned to the continent, where in 1436 he met Zosima. Together with Zosima, he returned to the islands, and, when eventually the monks started to arrive there, Solovetsky Monastery was founded. Zosima eventually became the hegumen of the monastery, which was subordinate to the Eparchy of Novgorod.

In 1479, after the death of Zosima, the new hegumen, Arseniy, sent Herman to Novgorod. Herman died in Novgorod at the same year, and his relics were to be moved back to Solovetsky Monastery. However, the monks did not manage to do it during the season, and buried Herman on Svir River. In 1484, the relics were transferred to Solovetsky Monastery.

Since 1692, Herman is venerated as a saint by the Russian Orthodox Church. Feast days are 30 July (12 August) (invention of the relics) and 8 (21) August (translation of the relics).

References 

1479 deaths
Russian Orthodox monks
Russian saints of the Eastern Orthodox Church
White Sea
15th-century Christian saints
Year of birth unknown
15th-century Christian monks